Maria Clara Trujillo (Macala) (born 27 November 1948) is an artist and sculptor from Bogotá, Colombia. She is a daughter of the painter Sergio Trujillo Magnenat and the ceramist Sara Dávila. She grew up in an environment that cultivated her passion for artistic expression.

After studying architecture, art and education, she started painting professionally in 1986 and made her first exhibition in Kingston (Jamaica) in 1990, followed by several exhibitions in art galleries and museums in Colombia, France and the U.S.

Her art comprises several techniques and styles, from the colorful Colombian landscapes in watercolors, acrylics and oils to expressive human figures in pastels, monotypes and sculptures in clay, bronze and latex.

Biography

Early life and education

Career

Style

Her work includes landscapes and human figures using a variety of techniques: watercolors, pastels, ink, acrylics, charcoal, monoprints, au temple, clay, bronze and plastics.

Exhibitions

Galería el Callejón, 1997
Bogotá Tennis Club, 1998
Rambouillet Salon, Ile de France (France)
Côte d'Azur, Cannes, Val d'Or (France)
Centre d'Art St. Jean, Bruges (Belgium)
Poirel Nancy (France)
Houston, Texas (US)

Examples of her work
 Juego (Monotype, 2003)
 Desnuda de lado (Pastel, 2003)
 Mujer recostada (Sculpture, 2001)
 Atardecer en el mar (Oil on canvas, 2003)

References

External links
 Official site
 Página de Colarte de Maria Clara Trujillo
 Fotoleyenda: conjunto de muestras
 El Tiempo: Casa Cuadrada exhibits

1958 births
Living people
20th-century sculptors
20th-century Colombian women artists
21st-century sculptors
21st-century Colombian women artists
Colombian painters
Colombian sculptors
Modern painters
Modern sculptors
Colombian women painters
Colombian women sculptors